Kearny Federal Ship Athletic Association Soccer Club (better known as Federal Ship F.C.) was a U.S. soccer team which competed for two seasons in the National Association Football League.

History
Federal Ship F.C. was the company team for the Federal Ship Company of Kearny, New Jersey.  The team played in New Jersey leagues, only coming to national prominence when it joined the National Association Football League in 1919.  Federal Ship spent two seasons in the NAFBL.  When the NAFBL folded in 1921 with the establishment of the American Soccer League, Federal Ship withdrew from professional competition.

Year-by-year

Honors
New Jersey State Challenge Cup
 Winner (1):  1921
 Runner Up (1): 1919

References

External links
 Allaway, Roger West Hudson: A Cradle of American Soccer
 National Association Football League standings

Kearny, New Jersey
Defunct soccer clubs in New Jersey
National Association Football League teams
Sports in Hudson County, New Jersey
Works soccer clubs in the United States